New Zealand competed at the 2002 Winter Olympics in Salt Lake City, United States.

Alpine skiing

Bobsleigh

Luge

Short track speed skating

Skeleton

References
Official Olympic Reports
 Olympic Winter Games 2002, full results by sports-reference.com

Nations at the 2002 Winter Olympics
2002 Winter Olympics
2002 in New Zealand sport